The  Phoenix Cardinals season was the franchise's 92nd season, 71st season in the National Football League and the 3rd in Arizona. Despite rookie running back Johnny Johnson creating a good enough impression to make the Pro Bowl, the Cardinals did not improve upon their 5–11 record from 1989.

Offseason

NFL draft

Personnel

Staff

Roster

Regular season

Schedule

Standings

References

External links
 1990 Phoenix Cardinals at Pro-Football-Reference.com

Phoenix Cardinals
Arizona Cardinals seasons
Phoenix